The First Presbyterian Church is a historic church at 200 North Second Street (corner of Second and Quay) in Dardanelle, Arkansas.  It is a roughly rectangular masonry structure, built out of buff-colored brick and light stone trim.  Its front facade consists of a pair of quoined and crenellated tower-like sections flanking a four-column pedimented gable portico, which shelters the entrance.  Built in 1912–14, it is locally distinctive for its Classical Revival architecture, and for its Akron Plan interior.

The building was listed on the National Register of Historic Places in 1987.

See also
Berry House (Dardanelle, Arkansas): the congregation's earlier building
National Register of Historic Places listings in Yell County, Arkansas

References

External links
First Presbyterian Church of Dardanelle web site

Presbyterian churches in Arkansas
Churches on the National Register of Historic Places in Arkansas
Neoclassical architecture in Arkansas
Churches completed in 1912
Churches in Yell County, Arkansas
1912 establishments in Arkansas
National Register of Historic Places in Yell County, Arkansas
Individually listed contributing properties to historic districts on the National Register in Arkansas
Neoclassical church buildings in the United States
Akron Plan church buildings
Dardanelle, Arkansas